Cody may refer to:

People
Cody (given name)
Cody (surname)
Cody (wrestler), a ring name of Cody Runnels

Places

Canada
Cody, British Columbia

United States
Cody, Florida
Cody (Duluth), Minnesota
Cody, Missouri
Cody, Nebraska
Cody, Wyoming
Cody Lake (Minnesota), a lake in Minnesota

Arts, entertainment, and media

Music
Cody (band), a Danish musical group 
Come On Die Young (CODY), a 1999 album and song by Scottish band Mogwai
 Cody (album), a 2016 album by Joyce Manor

Other arts, entertainment, and media
Cody, a buffalo that appeared in the movie Dances with Wolves
Cody from The Rescuers Down Under
Cody Maverick, a rockhopper penguin and the main character in the movie Surf's Up
Cody, the surname of Janine "Smurf", Andrew "Pope", Craig, Deran, Joshua "J", and Lena Cody's criminal family in Animal Kingdom
Cody (TV series), series of Australian television movies 
Commando Cody: Sky Marshal of the Universe, a Republic Pictures multi-chapter movie serial which began as a proposed syndicated television series

Other uses
CodY protein family, a bacterial protein family
 Cody Streaming, a streaming media service
Commander Cody (disambiguation), multiple meanings
USS Cody, a Spearhead-class expeditionary fast transport
Name of a South Pacific cyclone, Cyclone Cody

See also
Cote (disambiguation)
Nakia Codie (born 1977), American football player
Kodi (disambiguation)